Saint-Aubin-de-Nabirat (literally Saint-Aubin of Nabirat) is a commune in the Dordogne department in Nouvelle-Aquitaine in southwestern France.

Geography
The river Céou forms all of the commune's southern border.

Population

See also
Communes of the Dordogne department

References

Communes of Dordogne